Sargans railway station is a railway station in Sargans, in the Swiss canton of St. Gallen. It is an intermediate stop on the Chur–Rorschach line and eastern terminus of the Ziegelbrücke–Sargans line. It is served by local, regional, and long-distance trains.

Layout 
Sargans is a keilbahnhof and located between the Chur–Rorschach and Ziegelbrücke–Sargans railway lines. On the south side, serving the Ziegelbrücke–Sargans railway line, are two side platforms and an island platform with four tracks ( 2–5). On the north side, serving the Chur–Rorschach railway line, are two side platforms with two tracks (Nos. 6–7).

Services

Long-distance 
The following long-distance services call at Sargans:

 Intercity Express: Two round-trips per day over the Chur–Rorschach and Ziegelbrücke–Sargans lines between Hamburg and Chur.
 Railjet Express: Four round-trips per day over the Chur–Rorschach and Ziegelbrücke–Sargans lines from Zürich Hauptbahnhof to Vienna, Budapest, or Bratislava. 
 Nightjet/EuroNight: Overnight trains over the Chur–Rorschach and Ziegelbrücke–Sargans lines from Zürich Hauptbahnhof to Graz, Vienna, Prague, Budapest, or Zagreb.
 EuroCity Transalpin: Single round-trip per day over the Chur–Rorschach line between Zürich Hauptbahnhof and Graz Hauptbahnhof.
 InterCity: Hourly service over the Chur–Rorschach and Ziegelbrücke–Sargans lines from Basel SBB or Zürich Hauptbahnhof to Chur

Regional 
The following regional services call at Sargans:

 InterRegio:
 Hourly service over the Chur–Rorschach line between Zürich Hauptbahnhof and Chur.

Local 
Sargans is served by two services of the St. Gallen S-Bahn:

 : hourly service over the Chur–Rorschach and Ziegelbrücke–Sargans lines via Uznach (circular operation).
 : half-hourly service over the Chur–Rorschach line to Chur.

References

External links 

 

Railway stations in the canton of St. Gallen
Swiss Federal Railways stations